Shaul Matania (8 March 1937 - 20 July 2017) was an Israeli footballer. Matania played in defender positions. He played for Maccabi Tel Aviv and the Israeli national team. Matania won the title Israeli Footballer of the Year for the 1961–62 season.

Footballer career

Club career 
Matania started his football career in 1949, at the age of 12, when he joined the boys' team of Maccabi Tel Aviv. In 1953, when only 16, Matania joined the senior team. He was the defensive stronghold of the team for thirteen years. 

Matania scored 4 times in cup games, of which 2 were penalties, and once in a league game.  On 22 June 1957 Matania scored an equalizing goal in the 119th minute, virtually at end of the extension of the national cup semifinals, after Shlomo Nahari had shot Hapoel Petah Tikva to 2–1 in the 98th minute. Mantania's great stunt as a Tel Aviv defender in the Haifa Municipal Stadium was eventually to no avail, as Petah Tikva won 2–0 in the replay of the semifinals.

Until leaving Maccabi Tel Aviv's senior team in 1966, Matania won 3 national championships and 6 national cups. He had 253 caps in league games and 39 in cup games. A cool fact is that he never entered a game on the senior team as a replacement.

International career 
Matania earned 17 caps with the Israeli national football team. His debut was on 11 July 1956, in Moscow, in the pre-Olympic tournament against the Soviet Union national football team. In 1959 he played in the  six qualifying games of the Asia Cup in India, among these a 0–3 victory over Iran and 3–1 victory over India. Israel ended first in the qualifying round, yet Matania missed out on the 1960 finals in South Korea, where Israel ended second.

The last game in which Matania played for the national team was in 1961 when the Yugoslavia national football team beat Israel 0–2 in Ramat Gan. As a bencher, he was on the national team for many more years to come.

Player-coach and manager 
From 1966 to 1971, Matania was a player-coach at Maccabi Holon in Israel's second tier, Maccabi Zikhron Ya'akov (starting in 1968) in Israel's third tier, and Hapoel Kfar Shalem, also  in Israel's third tier. In 1971, Matania quit his player career and became the manager of Hapoel Giv'at Shmuel.

Personal and death 
Next to and after his football career, Matania worked as a PE educator.

Matania died on 20 July 2017 at the age of 80. He was buried at kibbutz Einat.

Honors
 1 Israeli Footballer of the Year: 1961-62
 1 Asia Cup: 1964  (plus runner-up in 1956)
 3 National Championships: 1953–54, 1955–56, 1957–58
 6 National Football Cup: 1953–54, 1954–55, 1957–58, 1958–59, 1963–64, 1964–65
 1 Super cup: 1955–56

References 

1937 births
2017 deaths
Israeli footballers
Maccabi Tel Aviv F.C. players
Footballers from Tel Aviv
20th-century Israeli educators
Israeli football managers
Association football player-managers
Maccabi Holon F.C. players
Israeli Footballer of the Year recipients